Tuggerah was an electoral district for the Legislative Assembly in the Australian State of New South Wales, which partly replaced Munmorah in 1981 and was named after the Tuggerah Lakes. In 1988, it was replaced by Wyong and The Entrance. Its only member was Harry Moore, representing the Labor Party.

Members for Tuggerah

Election results

References

Former electoral districts of New South Wales
1981 establishments in Australia
Constituencies established in 1981
1988 disestablishments in Australia
Constituencies disestablished in 1988